Mario Brenta (born 17 April 1942) is an Italian film director and screenwriter. His film Barnabo delle montagne was entered into the 1994 Cannes Film Festival.

Filmography
 Vermisat (1975)
 Istantanea per un delitto (1975)
 Maicol (1989)
 Barnabo delle montagne (1994)
 Segui le ombre (2004)
 Calle De La Pietà (2014)
 Corpo a corpo (2014)

References

External links

1942 births
Living people
Italian film directors
Italian screenwriters
Italian male screenwriters